(formerly known as ) is a Japanese video game developer that specializes in rhythm games.

It was co-founded by Keiichi Yano on February 3, 1997, as iNiS Ltd.. The company's former name iNiS is an acronym and it stands for "infinite Noise of the inner Soul."
In 2000, the company changed name to iNiS Corporation.

In December 2016, iNiSJ Corporation was founded. In March 2017, iNiS changed its name to Spica. After a while, in May, Spica went bankrupt.

In 2020, iNiSJ changed its name to LIONA Interactive.

Subsidiaries
 SONICA Co., Ltd.: Established in 2001, it is a provider of sound solutions.

Titles developed

CD/DVD-ROM

Video Games

Web design

Prototype titles

Engines
 FUEL audio library (for ACID)
 nFactor2 (next-generation rendering engine - Wii, Xbox 360, PC only)
 MixJuice (interactive music engine)
 Unreal Engine 3
 Unreal Engine 4
 Unity

Awards
 IGN's Best Nintendo DS developer of 2006

References

External links
  LIONA Interactive
  iNiS Corporation page: Japan, English
 Sonica Inc. page
 IGN Company Profile
 GDC 2007: The Keiichi Yano Interview

Amusement companies of Japan
Video game companies established in 1997
Video game companies of Japan
Video game development companies
Privately held companies of Japan
Japanese companies established in 1997